Thunder in the Sun is a 1959 American Western film directed by Russell Rouse and starring Susan Hayward and Jeff Chandler.

Plot
The film shows a family of French Basque immigrants pioneering into the Wild West while carrying their ancestral vines. Hard drinking trail driver Lon Bennett is hired to lead them and he falls for the spirited Gabrielle Dauphin.

Reception
The film is infamous among Basques for its misunderstandings of Basque customs, such as the use of the xistera (a device of the jai alai sport) as a weapon or shouting  ululations as meaningful communication.
Other commentators, though, have noted the well-staged action scenes, the absorbing story, and the excellent cinematography.

Cast
Susan Hayward as Gabrielle Dauphin
Jeff Chandler as Lon Bennett
Jacques Bergerac as Pepe Dauphin
Blanche Yurka as Louise Dauphin
Carl Esmond as Andre Dauphin
Fortunio Bonanova as Fernando Christophe
Bertrand Castelli as Edmond Duquette
Albert Carrier as Basque
Felix Locher as Danielle
Michele Marly
Albert Villasainte
Veda Ann Borg as Marie

Production
The film was made by Seven Arts Productions and acquired by Paramount for distribution. It was the company's third film, after Gunrunners and Ten Seconds to Hell. It was known during filming as Between the Thunder and the Sun and The Gun and the Arrow.

Filming started 21 July 1958 with location work in Mount Whitney.

See also
 List of American films of 1959

References

External links
 
 
Review of film at Variety

1959 films
Paramount Pictures films
Basque culture
1959 Western (genre) films
American Western (genre) films
Films directed by Russell Rouse
Films scored by Cyril J. Mockridge
Films with screenplays by Stewart Stern
1950s English-language films
1950s American films